Mátészalka is a district in central-eastern part of Szabolcs-Szatmár-Bereg County. Mátészalka is also the name of the town where the district seat is found. The district is located in the Northern Great Plain Statistical Region. This district is a part of Szatmár historical and geographical region.

Geography 
Mátészalka District borders with Vásárosnamény District to the north, Fehérgyarmat District and Csenger District to the east, the Romanian county of Satu Mare to the south, Nyírbátor District and Baktalórántháza District to the west. The number of the inhabited places in Mátészalka District is 26.

Municipalities 
The district has 3 towns, 3 large villages and 20 villages.
(ordered by population, as of 1 January 2013)

The bolded municipalities are cities, italics municipalities are large villages.

Demographics

In 2011, it had a population of 64,015 and the population density was 102/km².

Ethnicity
Besides the Hungarian majority, the main minorities are the Roma (approx. 7,500), German (1,000), Romanian (200) and Ukrainian (100).

Total population (2011 census): 64,015
Ethnic groups (2011 census): Identified themselves: 66,204 persons:
Hungarians: 57,546 (86.92%)
Gypsies: 7,259 (10.96%)
Germans: 899 (1.36%)
Others and indefinable: 500 (0.76%)
Approx. 2,000 persons in Mátészalka District did declare more than one ethnic group at the 2011 census.

Religion
Religious adherence in the county according to 2011 census:

Reformed – 31,809;
Catholic – 15,959 (Greek Catholic – 8,264; Roman Catholic – 7,695);
other religions – 2,171;
Non-religious – 3,884; 
Atheism – 163;
Undeclared – 10,029.

Gallery

See also
List of cities and towns of Hungary

References

External links
 Postal codes of the Mátészalka District

Districts in Szabolcs-Szatmár-Bereg County